{{DISPLAYTITLE:C11H18N2O3}}

The molecular formula C11H18N2O3 (molar mass: 226.27 g/mol) may be referred as:
 Amobarbital
 Pentobarbital
 Timoxeline Barbebutenol, a fictional drug in the film Johnny English Reborn